Mary Seaton (born July 18, 1956) is an American former alpine skier who competed in the 1976 Winter Olympics.

External links
 sports-reference.com

1956 births
Living people
American female alpine skiers
Olympic alpine skiers of the United States
Alpine skiers at the 1976 Winter Olympics
People from Virginia, Minnesota
University of Vermont alumni
20th-century American women